William H. Dugan (born June 5, 1959 in Hornell, New York) is an American former professional American football offensive lineman in the National Football League for the Seattle Seahawks, Minnesota Vikings, and the New York Giants.

Dugan played college football at Penn State University and was drafted in the third round of the 1981 NFL Draft. He earned a Bachelor of Science in Administration of Justice from Penn State in 1986.

Personal
Dugan lives in Hornell, New York, where he is in plumbing/heating repair.
He is also an active member of The Hornell Moose Lodge.

References 

1959 births
Living people
American football offensive linemen
Penn State Nittany Lions football players
People from Hornell, New York
Minnesota Vikings players
New York Giants players
Seattle Seahawks players
Philadelphia/Baltimore Stars players